WKFD (1370 AM) was a radio station which existed from 1961 until 2001 when its license was deleted after being silent for three years (the station last broadcast on July 29, 1998). WKFD was licensed to the village of Wickford, Rhode Island.  The station operated on 1370 kHz with a transmitter power of 250 watts daytime, 130 watts nighttime.  Its transmitter was located at 19 Updike Avenue. The station was at one time owned by retired newscaster Lou Adler, who had previously broadcast on WCBS 880.

After the WKFD license was deleted, another attempt was made to build 1370 kHz in Rhode Island, this time from Charlestown. Astro Tele-Communications Corp., owners of WADK and WJZS, was awarded a construction permit for the frequency in 2006 and chose the WKFD callsign. The new facility would have utilized 2,500 watts during the day and 5,000 at night—considerably higher than the original WKFD. This construction permit never made it on to the air and was deleted in November 2009.

References

External links
 

KFD
Radio stations established in 1961
Radio stations disestablished in 1998
Defunct radio stations in the United States
North Kingstown, Rhode Island
Charlestown, Rhode Island
1961 establishments in Rhode Island
1998 disestablishments in Rhode Island
KFD